Utah is a 1945 American Western film directed by John English and starring Roy Rogers.

Premise
Misunderstanding what her ranch is worth, Dorothy Bryant sells the land for far less than its value, so it is up to Roy to somehow get it back.

Cast 
Roy Rogers as Roy Rogers
Trigger as Trigger, Roy's Horse
George 'Gabby' Hayes as Gabby Wittaker
Dale Evans as Dorothy Bryant
Peggy Stewart as Jackie (Dorothy's friend)
 Beverly Lloyd as Wanda - Bob's girl friend
 Jill Browning as Babe (Dorothy's showgirl friend)
Vivien Oakland as Stella Mason
Grant Withers as Ben Bowman
Hal Taliaferro as Steve Lacy
Jack Rutherford as Sheriff McBride
Emmett Vogan as Chicago Police Chief
Bob Nolan as Bob
Sons of the Pioneers as Cowhands / Musicians

Soundtrack 
 Roy Rogers and the Sons of the Pioneers - "Lonesome Cowboy Blues" (Written by Tim Spencer)
 Sons of the Pioneers - "Five Little Miles" (Written by Bob Nolan)
 Roy Rogers, Dale Evans and the Sons of the Pioneers - "Utah" (Written by Charles Henderson)
 Dale Evans - "Thank Dixie For Me" (Written by Dave Franklin)
 Roy Rogers and the Sons of the Pioneers - "Utah Trail" (Written by Bob Palmer)
 Roy Rogers - "Beneath a Utah Sky" (Written by Glenn Spencer)
 The Sons of the Pioneers - "Welcome Home Miss Bryant" (Written by Ken Carson)
 Roy Rogers - "Wild and Wooly Gals From Out Chicago Way" (Written by Tim Spencer)

External links 

1945 films
Republic Pictures films
American black-and-white films
1945 Western (genre) films
American Western (genre) films
Films directed by John English
1940s English-language films
1940s American films